Alberto Lucio Centeno (born 26 January 1985 in Morelia, Michoacán) is a former Mexican football defender, who played for Monarcas Morelia in the Primera Division de Mexico.

He made his Primera Division debut against Dorados de Sinaloa in 2005 under former Morelia head coach Ricardo Ferretti.

References

1985 births
Living people
Liga MX players
Atlético Morelia players
Sportspeople from Morelia
Footballers from Michoacán
Mexican footballers
Association football defenders